Eparchy of Polog and Kumanovo is an Eastern Orthodox Eparchy of the Orthodox Ohrid Archbishopric, an autonomous and canonical branch of the Serbian Orthodox Church in North Macedonia. Its seat is in Kumanovo. Since 2004, the Bishop of Polog and Kumanovo is Joakim Jovčevski.

History
From 1018 to 1282, regions of Polog and Kumanovo were under ecclesiastical jurisdiction of Archbishopric of Ohrid. In 1282, regions were incorporated into Kingdom of Serbia and placed under the jurisdiction of Serbian Orthodox Church. In 1395, entire region was conquered by Ottoman Turks and placed again under the jurisdiction of Archbishopric of Ohrid.

In 1557, when Serbian Patriarchate of Peć was restored, regions were returned under its ecclesiastical jurisdiction. Since 1766, when Serbian Patriarchate was abolished, regions came under the jurisdiction of Patriarchate of Constantinople as part of the Eparchy of Skopje. In 1920 entire region was again returned to the jurisdiction of Serbian Orthodox Church.

In 1959, Serbian Orthodox Church granted autonomy to eparchies in Republic of Macedonia. After the unilateral and uncanonical proclamation of autocephaly of Macedonian Orthodox Church in 1967, ecclesiastical order was disrupted. Since Republic of Macedonia proclaimed independence in 1992, Serbian Orthodox Church decided to place all eparchies in Macedonia under special administration. In 1993, auxiliary bishop Jovan Mladenović of Tetovo (in the region of Polog) was appointed administrator of all eparchies in the Republic of Macedonia. Next year, he was transferred to another duty and administration of eparchies in Macedonia was given to Bishop Pahomije Gačić of Vranje. In 2003, Eparchy of Polog and Kumanovo was placed under the administration of Joakim Jovčevski, auxiliary Bishop of Velika. In 2004, he was elected as diocesan Bishop of Polog and Kumanovo.

See also
 Eparchy of Debar and Kičevo
 Orthodox Ohrid Archbishopric
 Archbishop Jovan VI of Ohrid

References

Sources

External links
 Bishopric of Polog and Kumanovo
 Orthodox Ohrid Archbishopric: Decisions
 Serbian Orthodox Church

Orthodox Ohrid Archbishopric
Religious sees of the Serbian Orthodox Church